Valentin Veselinov (born 15 June 1992) is a Bulgarian footballer who plays as a midfielder.

Career
Veselinov is a product of Sliven's youth system. He made his debut during the 2009–10 season on 25 March 2010 in a 0–1 away loss against Litex Lovech, coming on as a substitute for Nikolay Dimitrov.

In February 2012, Veselinov joined Botev Plovdiv.

In February 2017, after a short stint at Levski Karlovo, Veselinov returned to Chernomorets Balchik.

References

External links

Living people
1992 births
Bulgarian footballers
Association football midfielders
OFC Sliven 2000 players
Botev Plovdiv players
FC Dunav Ruse players
FC Etar 1924 Veliko Tarnovo players
FC Lyubimets players
PFC Spartak Varna players
Trikala F.C. players
PFC Dobrudzha Dobrich players
FC Chernomorets Balchik players
FC Levski Karlovo players
First Professional Football League (Bulgaria) players
Second Professional Football League (Bulgaria) players
Bulgarian expatriate footballers
Bulgarian expatriate sportspeople in Greece
Expatriate footballers in Greece